The Cal-Vada Lodge Hotel is a historic hotel in Crystal Bay, Nevada, United States, at the California-Nevada border at the north end of Lake Tahoe, is a Bungalow/craftsman-style hotel that was built in 1935.  It was listed on the National Register of Historic Places in 1994.

Description
The hotel is located at 24 Stateline Road (at the junction of Stateline Road and State Route 28 and at the California-Nevada border) near the north shore of Lake Tahoe,  It was built originally for use by the Cal-Vada Lodge, as a resort and casino. It was deemed significant for NRHP listing in 1994 for surviving as one of few 1930s-era Lake Tahoe-area hotels that has been preserved with integrity, and "as an important example of a small hotel designed in the Bungalow/Craftsman style and set in a rustic resort setting."

See also

 National Register of Historic Places listings in Washoe County, Nevada

References

External links

National Register of Historic Places in Washoe County, Nevada
Hotel buildings on the National Register of Historic Places in Nevada
Hotel buildings completed in 1935
Hotels in Nevada